Dalí Seen from the Back Painting Gala from the Back Eternalised by Six Virtual Corneas Provisionally Reflected by Six Real Mirrors is a 1972-73 oil on canvas painting by Salvador Dalí using geometric techniques first developed by Diego Velázquez and articulated in his 1656 work Las Meninas.  It is in the permanent collection of Dalí Theatre and Museum in Figueres, Spain. 

A stereoscopic work, it is an example of the work that Dalí pursued during the 1970s.

References

1973 paintings
Paintings by Salvador Dalí
Paintings about painting
Collection of the Dalí Theatre and Museum
Mirrors in art